The Control Structure Diagram automatically documents the program flow within the source code and adds indentation with graphical symbols. Thereby the source code becomes visibly structured without sacrificing space.

See also
 Diagram
 Entity-relationship model (ERD)
 Hierarchy diagram
 Data Structure Diagram
 Unified Modeling Language
 Visual programming language

External links
 "The Control Structure Diagram (CSD)" - A chapter from jGRASP Tutorials
 "Control Structure Diagrams for Ada 95"

Data modeling diagrams
Data modeling languages
Source code